Craig Dahl (born June 17, 1985) is a former American football safety who played nine seasons in the National Football League. He was signed by the Giants as an undrafted free agent in 2007. He played college football at North Dakota State.

He earned a Super Bowl ring during his first stint with the Giants in their Super Bowl XLII win against Tom Brady and the New England Patriots. Dahl has also played for the St. Louis Rams and the San Francisco 49ers.

Early years
Dahl was a First-team All-state, All-conference and All-city for Mankato East High School. He ran for 3,398 yards and passed for 1,769 yards as a quarterback over his final two years and scored 57 touchdowns. He quarterbacked the team to a runner up finish at the state tournament his junior year. He also competed in basketball and track & field (as a High jumper and long jumper). He holds many football records for the high school as well as many track records. (see below)

He Holds the following records in track at Mankato East High School.
38.84 in 300 Hurdles,
Long Jump, and
Triple Jump

As a sophomore, he finished 10th at the state meet in Long Jump.

As a Junior he hurdled/jumped at the state meet finishing with the following times and places.
4th in the 110 hurdles running 14.85
3rd in Long Jump with a jump of 22-07.25

As a senior, he hurdled/jumped at the state meet finishing with the following times and places.
5th in the 110 hurdles running 15.02
3rd in the 300 Hurdles running 38.84
3rd in the Long Jump jumping 22-3
4th in the Triple Jump jumping 44-2

College career
Dahl played in 43 games for the Bison and posted 238 tackles (134 solo), 8 passes defensed, 7 interceptions and two sacks. In 2006 As a senior, recorded 61 tackles (32 solo), 2 interceptions and a sack and was First-team All-GWFC. In 2005, he was Second-team All-Great West and had 71 tackles, an interception forced a fumble and blocked a kick. He started in all 11 games at strong safety and led NDSU with 49 solo tackles including one tackle for loss and second overall with 71 total tackles and two pass breakups, one interception, a fumble recovery and one forced fumble. In 2004, as a sophomore, he started all 11 games and was named First-team All-Great West Football Conference. In 2003, he played in 10 games and had 24 tackles, and an interception and blocked a kick .

Professional career

Pre-draft

New York Giants
Dahl signed with the New York Giants after playing college football at North Dakota State University. On September 2, 2007, he was placed on the 53-man roster.  Through week 12 of the 2007 season, Dahl had three tackles. One tackle was against his home-state Vikings. On December 8, 2007, Craig made his first NFL start of his career against the Eagles. He had five tackles in the game. He tore his anterior cruciate ligament in a game against the New England Patriots, and did not play again.

Dahl was waived by the Giants in February 2008 after failing a physical. He was re-signed on July 30, 2008, however, Dahl later again in the Giants' third preseason game tore his ACL. He was placed on injured reserve ending his season.

An exclusive-rights free agent after the 2008 season, Dahl was not tendered an offer and became an unrestricted free agent in the 2009 offseason.

St. Louis Rams
Dahl was signed by the St. Louis Rams on March 17, 2009. The move reunited him with Rams head coach Steve Spagnuolo, who was the Giants' defensive coordinator during Dahl's time in New York. The Rams re-signed Dahl on March 7, 2010.

San Francisco 49ers
Dahl signed a three-year deal with the San Francisco 49ers on March 16, 2013.

He was released by the 49ers on September 4, 2015.

Second stint with Giants
Dahl re-signed with the New York Giants on September 7, 2015.

NFL statistics

References

External links
 San Francisco 49ers profile

1985 births
Living people
Sportspeople from Mankato, Minnesota
Players of American football from Minnesota
American football safeties
North Dakota State Bison football players
New York Giants players
St. Louis Rams players
San Francisco 49ers players